The Patriarchate of Venice, also sometimes called the Archdiocese of Venice, is a Latin Church ecclesiastical territory or patriarchal archdiocese of the Catholic Church in Venice, Italy. In 1451 the Patriarchate of Grado was merged with the Bishopric of Castello and Venice to form the Archdiocese of Venice.

The ordinary of the archdiocese is the Patriarch of Venice, who was traditionally created a cardinal in consistory by the Pope. The Patriarch of Venice has, however, the right to wear cardinal's scarlet vestment. The mother church of the archdiocese is the Basilica di San Marco in Venezia.

As a metropolitan see, the Patriarch of Venice is the metropolitan of the Ecclesiastical Province of Venice. Its suffragan dioceses include Adria-Rovigo, Belluno-Feltre, Chioggia, Concordia-Pordenone, Padova, Treviso, Verona, Vicenza, and Vittorio Veneto.


Patriarchs of Venice

References

Books

Reference works
 (in Latin)
 (in Latin)

 pp. 946–947. (Use with caution; obsolete)
 (in Latin)
 (in Latin)
 (in Latin)

Studies

Venice, Italy
Venice
Venice